The UNCAF Under-19 Tournament is an biennial football competition for men organised by the sport's Central American governing body, UNCAF.

History
On 21 July 2018, the Central American Football Union announced through their Twitter account the launch of this new tournament.  The first edition will be played in Honduras from 19 to 26 August 2018.  The tournament's sole purpose is for the teams to prepare for the upcomings CONCACAF Under-20 Championships and not as a qualifier.

Results

See also
 UNCAF U-16 Tournament

References

External links
 UNCAF website

 
Central American Football Union competitions
Under-19 association football competitions
Recurring sporting events established in 2018